Stephen Fewell is a British actor who portrays Jason Kane in the audio adventures of Bernice Summerfield. He has also appeared in classical theatre, in various Doctor Who audio productions, an episode of the 2005 Channel 4 drama The Courtroom, Headlong Theatre's production of Paradise Lost at the Hackney Empire and in the musical play ENRON at the Royal Court and in the West End.

He has written short stories: three for Doctor Who and one for Bernice Summerfield anthologies.

He originated the role of Charrington in the original Headlong Theatre production of George Orwell's 1984

In September and October 2012 he played Alan Turing at The English Theatre Frankfurt in Hugh Whitemore's biographical play Breaking the Code.

In 2019 he played the Scofield/McKellen role of Pierre in Venice Preserv'd for the RSC.

In 2019 he appears as Pope Clement V in the History Channel Knight's Templar drama Knightfall.

In 2019 appears as Lord Grey in Netflix production of The King.

He is also known as founder and chair of the James Menzies-Kitchin Trust, which has launched the careers of many leading UK theatre directors, including; Thea Sharrock, Polly Findlay, Bijan Sheibani, Joe Hill-Gibbins, Roy Alexander Weisse, Natalie Abrahami, Kate Hewitt.

In 2022 he appeared in Patriots at the Almeida Theatre.

References

1973 births
Living people
British male stage actors
British male voice actors